Spanish is the official and most commonly spoken language in Ecuador. Northern Quechua and other pre-colonial American languages are spoken by 2,300,000 (Adelaar 1991). Ethnologue lists 24 languages of Ecuador:

 Achuar–Shiwiar
 Awa–Cuaiquer
 Cha'palaachi
 Cofán
 Colorado 
 Ecuadorian Sign Language
 Emberá languages
 Media Lengua
 9 varieties of Quechua
 Secoya
 Shuar
 Spanish
 Siona
 Tetete
 Waorani
 Záparo

References